Dancevoir is a commune in the Haute-Marne department in north-eastern France.

History
Dancevoir is named in Le Conscrit des cent villages, a poem of Louis Aragon, written as an act of intellectual Resistance clandestinely in spring 1943, during the Second World War.

The maternal grandmother of American scientist Bill Nye originated from the commune. Illustrator Danièle Bour currently resides in Dancevoir with her husband.

Demographics

The commune's population in 2012 was 227, a decline of 9.6% from the 251 reported in 2006.

See also
 Communes of the Haute-Marne department

References

Communes of Haute-Marne